Justyna Śmietanka (born 24 September 1994) is a Polish pole vaulter.

She finished fifth at the 2017 Summer Universiade. She also competed at the 2015 European U23 Championships and the 2016 European Championships without reaching the final.

Her personal best vault is 4.45 metres, achieved in July 2017 in Rottach-Egern.

References 

1994 births
Living people
Polish female pole vaulters
Place of birth missing (living people)
Polish Athletics Championships winners
Competitors at the 2017 Summer Universiade